Brancsikia is a genus of praying mantises in the new (2019) family Majangidae and the monotypic subfamily Brancsikiinae; it was previously placed in the Deroplatyinae.

Species
There are now two species in the genus Brancsikia, listed in the Mantodea Species File:
Brancsikia aeroplana Lamberton, 1911
Brancsikia freyi Brancsik, 1893 (synonym: Brancsikia simplex) - type species

See also
Dead leaf mantis

References

External links

Mantodea genera
Taxa named by Henri Louis Frédéric de Saussure
Taxa named by Leo Zehntner